Aleksander Schipai (also Aleksander Šipai; 8 August 1890 Saint Petersburg - 1 May 1942 Turinsk, Sverdlovsk Oblast, USSR) was an Estonian politician. He was a member of the Estonian Constituent Assembly, representing the Estonian People's Party. He was a member of the assembly since 22 May 1919. He replaced Oskar Kallas.

References

1890 births
1942 deaths
Politicians from Saint Petersburg
People from Sankt-Peterburgsky Uyezd
Estonian People's Party politicians
Members of the Estonian Constituent Assembly
People who died in the Gulag
Estonian people who died in Soviet detention